Bixio is a surname. Notable people with the surname include:

 Cesare Andrea Bixio (1896-1978), Italian composer
 Jacques Alexandre Bixio (1808-1875), French doctor, balloonist and politician
 Nino Bixio (1821-1873), Italian soldier and politician

See also
 Bixio Music Group
 MV Nino Bixio

Surnames of Italian origin